Calgary-North Hill was a provincial electoral district in Calgary, Alberta, Canada, mandated to return a single member to the Legislative Assembly of Alberta using the first past the post method of voting from 1971 to 2012.

History
The Calgary-North Hill electoral district was created in the 1971 boundary redistribution out of Calgary Bowness and a small sliver on the south end of Calgary Queens Park and Calgary North. The riding covered central portion of north Calgary.

Since 1971, the district returned Progressive Conservative candidates. Some elections saw some very competitive races with other party candidates coming close to winning.

Boundary history

Electoral history
The electoral district was created in the 1971 boundary re-distribution. The first election held in the district that year saw a hotly contested race with former Calgary Alderman Roy Farran running as a candidate for the Progressive Conservatives against incumbent Social Credit MLA Robert Simpson and future NDP MLA Barry Pashak. Farran won the race by 61 votes over Simpson to pick up the district for his party.

Premier Peter Lougheed appointed Farran to his cabinet in 1973. He ran for a second term in office in the 1975 general election with ministerial advantage against Simpson for the second time. This time Farran would defeat him in a landslide. Farran would remain in cabinet until he retired at dissolution in 1979.

The 1979 general election saw Progressive Conservative candidate Ed Oman hold the seat with a landslide. He was re-elected to a second term in 1982 winning the biggest popular vote of any candidate in the history of the district. Oman retired at dissolution in 1986.

Progressive Conservative candidate Fred Stewart became the third representative of the district winning election for the first time in the 1986 election. He was re-elected to a second term in the 1989 general election facing a strong challenge from both the Liberal and NDP candidates. He retired at from provincial politics at the end of his second term in 1993.

Richard Magnus became the fourth representative for the district in the 1993 general election. He faced a strong challenge from Liberal candidate Tom Dixon but still won a comfortable plurality to hold the district for his party. Magnus was re-elected three more times in 1997, 2001 and 2004 before retiring from office in the 2008 general election.

The last representative was Progressive Conservative MLA Kyle Fawcett who was elected for the first time in the 2008 general election in a hotly contested race over Liberal candidate Pat Murray.

Election results

1971 general election

1975 general election

1979 general election

1982 general election

1986 general election

1989 general election

1993 general election

1997 general election

2001 general election

2004 general election

2008 general election

Senate election results

2004 Senate nominee election district results

Voters had the option of selecting 4 Candidates on the Ballot

2004 Student Vote

On November 19, 2004 a Student Vote was conducted at participating Alberta schools to parallel the 2004 Alberta general election results. The vote was designed to educate students and simulate the electoral process for persons who have not yet reached the legal majority. The vote was conducted in 80 of the 83 provincial electoral districts with students voting for actual election candidates. Schools with a large student body that reside in another electoral district had the option to vote for candidates outside of the electoral district then where they were physically located.

See also
List of Alberta provincial electoral districts

References

Further reading

External links
Elections Alberta
The Legislative Assembly of Alberta
Riding Map for Calgary North Hill

Former provincial electoral districts of Alberta
Politics of Calgary